Best Flow, Inc.(베스트플로우) is a Korean entertainment company, headquartered in Seoul, Korea. It was founded on 26 September 1994 as Datagate International, changed its name to Yuri International(여리인터내셔널) in 2005 and Best Flow in 2008.

Business sector
Management of Celebrities
Producing and investing in films and TV programs
Producing and distributing music
Star marketing, selling merchandise
Multimedia
Games

Related companies
Trifecta Entertainment
Climix Entertainment
I Star Cinema

Companies listed on KOSDAQ
Entertainment companies of South Korea
South Korean companies established in 1994